Kadri Simson (née Must, born 22 January 1977) is an Estonian politician from the Centre Party, European Commissioner for Energy in the von der Leyen Commission since 1 December 2019. She was previously Minister of Economic Affairs and Communications in Jüri Ratas' first cabinet from 2016 to 2019.

In 2015 she unsuccessfully challenged party leader Edgar Savisaar for his role after an almost uninterrupted 25-year tenure. Savisaar won the vote of 541 delegates, to Simson's 486, from a total of 1,051.

From 2009 to 2016 Simson was the chairwoman of the Centre Party fraction in the Riigikogu.

References

External links 

|-

1977 births
21st-century Estonian politicians
21st-century Estonian women politicians
Alumni of University College London
Estonian Centre Party politicians
Estonian European Commissioners
European Commissioners 2019–2024
Government ministers of Estonia
Living people
Members of the Riigikogu, 2007–2011
Members of the Riigikogu, 2011–2015
Members of the Riigikogu, 2015–2019
Members of the Riigikogu, 2019–2023
Politicians from Tartu
University of Tartu alumni
Women European Commissioners
Women government ministers of Estonia
Women members of the Riigikogu